Jawala is a village in Parner taluka in Ahmednagar district of state of Maharashtra, India.

Religion
The majority of the population in the village is Hindu.

Economy
The majority of the population has farming as their primary occupation. Besides with changing environmental situations younger population intended to established non agricultural business.

See also
 Parner taluka
 Villages in Parner taluka
•Jawala is 11.8413 square kilometres and is located in Madhya Pradesh in India. India is a country in southeast Asia and has a flag with a ratio of 3:2.

References 

Villages in Parner taluka
Villages in Ahmednagar district